"Brightside" (stylized in all uppercase) is a song by American folk rock band The Lumineers. It was released on September 20, 2021, as the lead single from the band's fourth studio album of the same name. The song was written by Jeremiah Fraites and Wesley Schultz, and produced by Simone Felice, David Baron, Brian Hubblen, Rick Mullen and Derek Brown.

Content
The band's singer-guitarist Wesley Schultz stated in a press release: "The song 'Brightside' was recorded in a single day. It's like a 15-year-old's fever dream, an American love story in all its glory and heartbreak. The last couple left, on the run from something and all alone".

Music video
An accompanying video was released on September 29, 2021, and directed by Kyle Thrash. It was filmed at an American Legion Hall. At the beginning of the video, a variety of people answer the question: "What does love mean to you?" And showcases "the love of couples of all ages, races, and genders dance the waltz around the band as they perform the song." Schultz commented the video: "The 'Brightside' music video is like a documentary of the American love story. It features all real people - none of the people that appear in it are actors".

Live performance
On September 20, 2021, the band performed the song on Jimmy Kimmel Live!.

Credits and personnel
Credits adapted from AllMusic.

 Luke Armentrout – assistant mastering engineer
 David Baron – bass, engineer, mixing, organ, piano, producer, synthesizer
 Derek Brown – producer, sound supervision
 Taylor Chadwick – assistant mastering engineer
 Andrew Darby – assistant mastering engineer
 James Felice – vocals (background)
 Simone Felice – producer, recording arranger, tambourine, vocals (background)
 Jeremiah Fraites – bass (electric), composer, drums, piano, recording arranger
 Sara Full – production coordination
 Bobbi Giel – assistant mastering engineer
 Renee Hikari – stage assistant
 Anthony Hook – editing assistant
 Brian Hubblen – producer, sound supervision
 Byron Isaacs – vocals (background)
 The Lumineers – primary artist
 Andrew Mendelson – mastering engineer
 Rick Mullen – Producer, Sound Supervision
 Wesley Schultz – composer, guitar (electric), recording arranger, vocals, vocals (background)

Charts

Weekly charts

Year-end charts

Release history

References

2021 singles
2021 songs
The Lumineers songs
Decca Records singles
Dualtone Records singles